is a Japanese manga series by Yuki Fumino. I Hear the Sunspot is serialized in the semi-monthly boys' love manga anthology Canna since December 22, 2013. A live-action film adaptation of the first volume was released on June 24, 2017.

Plot

College student Taichi Sagawa learns that his lonely classmate, Kohei Sugihara, is deaf, and he enrolls in a part-time job to take notes for him in exchange for food. As the two become more acquainted with each other, they develop a strong friendship that eventually turns into love.

Characters

;  (film)
Kohei is a college student who had a sudden hearing loss in high school, and because of his disability, he struggles to fit in and is usually seen alone.

;  (film)
Taichi is an optimstic and outgoing college student who takes on the job of taking notes for Kohei part-time in exchange for food.

;  (film)

Media

Manga

I Hear the Sunspot is written and illustrated by Yuki Fumino as her debut work. Fumino came up with the idea of writing about the hearing impaired from being around friends and acquaintances who had a hearing disability. She wrote I Hear the Sunspot based on what she learned from them as well as visiting a sign language school.

I Hear the Sunspot was serialized in the semi-monthly  manga anthology Canna from December 22, 2013 to August 2014. Originally released as a single-volume story, it was followed up with I Hear the Sunspot: Theory of Happiness from April 22, 2015 to February 2016. After the story's end, Fumino continued with a third series, titled I Hear the Sunspot: Limit, from October 2016 to December 2019. A fourth series titled I Hear the Sunspot: Four Seasons began publication in December 2020 and is still ongoing. The chapters have been released in 6 bound volumes by France Shoin under the Canna Comics imprint as of December 2021.

One Peace Books publishes I Hear the Sunspot in English for North American distribution.

Film

A live-action film adaptation of I Hear the Sunspot was announced through the physical release of the first volume on the wrap-around band. Additional cast members included Ami Yamazaki, Miyū Ōsaka, Hiroe Igeta, Rima Matsuda, Yūki Fukumoto, Tsubasa Shimada, Hideyuki Araki, Anna Kijima, Suzuno Nomura, Norihisa Hiranuma, Shinshō Nakamura, and Reiko Takashima. The film was directed by Daisuke Kamijō. It was released on June 24, 2017.

Reception

Rebecca Silverman from Anime News Network reviewed I Hear the Sunspot favorably, praising its exploration of school stereotypes and Kohei and Taichi's relationship. Regarding Theory of Happiness, she described it as being "sweet and thoughtful" and praised the art, but she also stated that it had "excessive" angst. For Limit, Silverman praised the story's exploration of "different lived experiences of being 'normal. Corinne Barrett Percy described Kohei as an example of how people with disabilities and queer identities are seen as outsiders in Japanese society.

At Comic-Con International 2018, I Hear the Sunspot was selected as an "under-appreciated gem" at a panel composed of manga critics and industry insiders. I Hear the Sunspot was selected by visitors of the website Nijimen as one of the best boys' love manga for newcomers to the genre. It was included in 2018 list of Great Graphic Novels for Teens produced by American Library Association's Young Adult Library Services Association.

In Japan, volume 1 of Limit ranked at no. 45 on Oricon and sold 16,833 physical copies in its first week of sales. Volume 2 of Limit ranked at no. 31 on Oricon and sold 20,128 physical copies in its first week of sales.

References

2017 films
2017 LGBT-related films
Boys' love films
Japanese romantic drama films
Japanese LGBT-related films
LGBT-related romantic drama films
Live-action films based on manga
Manga adapted into films
Yaoi anime and manga